Pie and peas is a traditional meal in the north of England, consisting of an individual meat pie served with mushy peas and gravy.

History
The pies are normally bought rather than home-made. Pie and pea shops and stalls used to be a common feature on Northern streets and markets, but these days it is more usually sold in sandwich shops and "chippies". Some people prefer meat and potato or steak pies.
Pie and peas is a staple on the British football terraces and is popular amongst football fans.

See also
Pie floater
Steak pie
Pie and mash

References

British cuisine
Legume dishes